Luther Bridge (German: Lutherbrücke) is a bridge over the Spree in Berlin, Germany. The bridge connects Spreeweg, adjacent to the Tiergarten, with Paulstraße in Moabit.

Design and history
The bridge was built in 1892 and is named after Martin Luther, who was a seminal figure in the Protestant Reformation. The bridge was designed by architects Karl Bernhard and Otto Stahn.

References

External links
 

1892 establishments in Germany
Bridges completed in 1892
Bridges in Berlin
Buildings and structures in Mitte